Lano Kash-Pride Hill (born Delano Kash-Pride Hill; November 26, 1995) is an American football safety for the Michigan Panthers of the United States Football League (USFL). He played college football at Michigan. He is the older brother of Lavert Hill.

High school
In high school, Hill and Jourdan Lewis anchored the Cass Technical High School defensive backfield that won the 2011 and 2012 Michigan High School Athletic Association Division 1 championships for coach Thomas Wilcher.

College career
During his senior year, Hill helped lead the defense by posting a career best of 52 tackles, 4.5 tackles-for-loss, three interceptions and three pass breakups. In his four-year career at Michigan, Hill contributed 119 tackles, seven tackles-for-loss, one forced fumble, one fumble recovery, three interceptions and eight pass breakups. Following the 2016 season, Hill was named to the All-Big Ten defensive second-team, by the coaches.

Professional career

Seattle Seahawks
The Seattle Seahawks selected Hill in the third round (95th overall) of the 2017 NFL Draft. He was the 11th safety selected in 2017.

On June 15, 2017, the Seattle Seahawks signed him to a four-year, $3.2 million contract that includes a signing bonus of $727,476.

On December 12, 2017, Hill was ejected after hitting Mike Thomas and Kevin Peterson after participating on punt recovery plays during a 42-7 loss. On December 22, 2017, the NFL fined him $12,154 for his fight with multiple Rams players.

Hill entered the 2018 season as the third-string free safety behind Earl Thomas and Tedric Thompson. He was later named the backup to Tedric Thompson after Earl Thomas was placed on season-ending injured reserve prior to Week 5. Hill made his first start of the season in Week 16 in place of an injured Thompson. He was placed on injured reserve on January 1, 2019 after suffering a hip injury in Week 17.

On October 21, 2020, Hill was placed on injured reserve with a back injury.

Carolina Panthers
On May 16, 2021, Hill signed with the Carolina Panthers. He was placed on the Reserve/COVID-19 list on July 28, 2021. On August 11, 2021, the Panthers activated him from the reserve/COVID-19 list and then released him.

Michigan Panthers
On February 17, 2023, Hill signed with the Michigan Panthers of the United States Football League (USFL).

References

External links
Seattle Seahawks bio
Michigan Wolverines bio

1995 births
American football safeties
Carolina Panthers players
Cass Technical High School alumni
Living people
Michigan Panthers (2022) players
Michigan Wolverines football players
Players of American football from Detroit
Seattle Seahawks players